French house, also known as French touch, filter house and tekfunk, is a style of house music originally produced by French musicians in the 1990s. It is a form of Euro disco and a popular strand of the late 1990s and 2000s European dance music scene. The defining characteristics of the sound are reliant on filter and phaser effects both on and alongside samples from late 1970s and early 1980s American or European disco tracks (or original hooks strongly inspired by such samples), causing thicker harmonic foundations than the genre's forerunners. Most tracks in this genre are in  time and feature steady four on the floor beats in the tempo range of 110–130 beats per minute. French house is similar to future funk, although there are some key differences. Purveyors of French house include Daft Punk, Stardust, Cassius, The Supermen Lovers, Modjo, Justice, and Étienne de Crécy.

History and influences 
French house is greatly influenced by the lineage of American dance music from the emergence of disco onwards, maintaining a distinct connection to Euro disco and the short lived space disco music style. Space disco was very popular in France, during the late 1970s and early 1980s, alongside artists such as Cerrone, Sheila and B. Devotion, the latter with their 1979 hit Spacer. Additional influences came from P-Funk, especially the George Clinton and Bootsy Collins hits of that era. P-Funk was played alongside disco in many French discothèques, especially after the Disco Demolition Night took place in the United States. The Jacking aspect of Chicago house was also incorporated (with "jack house" becoming a short-lived descriptive term for the sound in the UK). It also included influence of musical French figures of the seventies such as François de Roubaix, Jean-Michel Jarre or Serge Gainsbourg.

Thomas Bangalter's tracks for his Roulé label is considered by some to be the earliest examples of an attempt to establish a distinctive style of French house. His solo material, along with his work as a member of Daft Punk and Stardust, had a significant impact upon the French house scene during the mid-to-late 1990s. The French duo Motorbass (Philippe Zdar, later of Cassius, and Étienne de Crécy) were also among the first in France to produce house tracks largely based around samples and filtered loops. These tracks inspired emerging American house producers such as DJ Sneak, Green Velvet and Roger Sanchez to produce sample-led house tracks with deep funky grooves, and ultimately resulted in the release of a sole full-length album, Pansoul. Parisian producer St. Germain produced house tracks with a similar style at the time however these were more directly influenced by jazz as opposed to the brasher vocal disco records appropriated. Other known French DJ-turned-producers at the time such as François Kevorkian and Laurent Garnier remained distant from the emerging French house label.

UK dance music and European DJs first recognised French house experiments in the mid-1990s, however commercial success occurred a few years later in 1997. Daft Punk, Cassius and later, Stardust were the first internationally successful artists of the genre. Along with Air, these acts were signed to Virgin Records and benefited from distinctive music videos directed by the likes of Spike Jonze, Michel Gondry and Alex & Martin. Due to awareness generated from the huge clubbing scene and major record company support, Daft Punk's debut album Homework entered the top 10 of the UK album charts on release and became the biggest-selling French act in the UK since Jean-Michel Jarre. The emergence of the French sound coincided with dance music's popularity in the influential UK market which was peaking commercially with general electronic music.

Further international commercial success continued into 2000 with Bob Sinclar, Étienne de Crécy, Benjamin Diamond and Modjo achieving hit singles around Europe. In late 2005, pop superstar Madonna released Confessions on a Dance Floor; an album with significant French house influences in several of its songs.

Terms, origins and variations 

The term "French Touch" was first used in Paris in July 1987. Jean-Claude Lagrèze, a photographer of parisians' nights created a couple of "French Touch" parties at The Palace to make people discover house music. The parties were driven by DJ Laurent Garnier, Guillaume la Tortue and David Guetta. The expression "We Give a French Touch to House" was printed on a bomber jacket by Éric Morand for Fnac Music Dance Division in 1991.

Prior to 1996, "French house" had been referred to among Europeans as "nu-disco", "disco house" and "new disco". The term "French touch" was popularised by music journalist Martin James in the weekly music paper known as Melody Maker. He referred to the term in 1996 as a review of Étienne de Crécy's first album Super Discount. This term became favoured among the French media and was then widely used in the UK press by 1998. The French newspaper, Libertation and Radio NRJ acknowledged Martin James as the coiner of the "French Touch". The term was then used on an MTV News special, to describe a "French house explosion" phenomenon. Bob Sinclar was interviewed, as well as Air (a non-house act) and Cassius. This news special later aired on all MTV local variations worldwide, spreading the term and introducing the "French house" sound to the mainstream population.

Between 1998 and 2001, local music shop Discobole Records imported the records directly from France and middle class clubs dedicated totally to the genre, such as City Groove. In Greece, this music style was promoted as "disco house". During 1999, many events also took place on Spain's Ibiza island, and has continued to be a very popular destination for British tourists.

French house can be described as a combination of three production styles. One is what the French refer to as "the French touch" and it is the style that greatly influenced by the space disco sound. The second is a continuation and update of Euro disco and greatly influenced by the productions of Alec R. Costandinos. The third would be the deep American house style, evident in the similar treatment of samples and repetitive 'funky' hooks. Naturally, further variations and mutations followed. French house maintains the established "French Touch" sound, focused more on Euro disco-like vocals and less emphasis on the "space disco" themes. However, most of the music's most successful acts have altered their sound since. Bob Sinclar's later work, including the hit single "World, Hold On (Children of the Sky)" maintains only a distant connection to the original French house sound. Both Daft Punk and Étienne de Crécy subsequently developed a harder synthetic sound more directly inspired by techno, electro and pop.

Record labels associated with the style 

 20000st
 Astralwerks (U.S. market)
 Barclay (record label)
 Bromance
 Crydamoure
 Diamond Traxx
 Disques Solid
 Dynamic Recordings
 Ed Banger Records
 F Communications
 Fiat Lux
 Kitsuné
 Moveltraxx
 Pont Neuf Records
 Record Makers
 Roche Musique
 Roulé
 Versatile Records
 Vulture Music
 We Rock Music
 Work It Baby

References 

20th-century music genres
 
House music genres
French styles of music
Music scenes